Polyochodes is a monotypic snout moth genus described by Pierre Chrétien in 1911. It contains the single species, described in the same publication, Polyochodes stipella, which is found in Tunisia, Algeria and Spain.

The wingspan is 21–25 mm.

References

Anerastiini
Monotypic moth genera
Moths of Africa
Moths of Europe
Pyralidae genera